Panterita del Ring Jr. is the ring name of a Mexican luchador enmascarado, or masked professional wrestler. He currently works for Consejo Mundial de Lucha Libre (CMLL) where he portrays a tecnico ("Good guy") wrestling character and is the current Mexican National Lightweight Champion. His real name is not a matter of official record as he is an enmascarado, which by lucha libre traditions means that his personal life is kept secret from the general public.

Personal life
Panterita del Ring Jr. is the son of Ephesto, and his ring name refers to his father's previous gimmick. He is also the nephew of Jesús Parra Ramírez, who also works for CMLL under the name Luciferno and has previously worked under ring names such as Hooligan, El Hombre Sin Nombre (years after Ephesto used the same name) and Último Rebelde. Panterita del Ring Jr.'s cousin made his CMLL debut in 2014 under the name "El Rebelde".

Championships and accomplishments
Consejo Mundial de Lucha Libre
Mexican National Lightweight Championship (1 time, current)
Torneo Gran Alterntiva (2022) - with Místico

Footnotes

References

Date of birth missing (living people)
Living people
Masked wrestlers
Mexican male professional wrestlers
Unidentified wrestlers
Year of birth missing (living people)